Connor Riece George Parsons (born 27 October 2000) is an English professional footballer who plays as a midfielder for Waterford.

Career

Early career
Parsons played as a youth with Norwich City, leaving the club in December 2019 by mutual consent. He then played for Norwich United, scoring 5 goals in 12 games in all competitions, before signing for Lowestoft Town in October 2020. After scoring 1 goal in 7 games in all competitions, he left the club in March 2021 to sign for Icelandic club Tindastóll. He moved to Dalvík/Reynir in April 2021, for whom he made seven appearances.

Wycombe Wanderers
He returned to the UK to sign a one-year contract with Wycombe Wanderers in August 2021. On 31 August 2021, Parsons scored his first goal for the club in a 3-1 English Football League Trophy loss to Aston Villa U21s. On 26 November 2021, Parsons joined National League side Notts County on loan until 29 January 2022. On 4 February 2022 Parsons signed for National League side Bromley on an initial one-month loan. On 2 March 2022, the loan deal was extended until the end of the season. On 10 May 2022, Parsons was recalled by his parent club after 11 appearances. His Wycombe contract was renewed for the 2022–23 season.

In August 2022 he moved on loan to Solihull Moors.

In December 2022 it was announced that he would sign for Irish club Waterford in January 2023.

Personal life
After his release from Norwich City, Parsons "built a social media audience" and had 40,000 subscribers on YouTube as of October 2020, In June 2022 he featured in a YouTube video, where people had to guess the professional footballer.

References

2000 births
Living people
English footballers
Norwich City F.C. players
Norwich United F.C. players
Lowestoft Town F.C. players
Ungmennafélagið Tindastóll men's football players
Dalvík/Reynir players
Wycombe Wanderers F.C. players
Notts County F.C. players
Bromley F.C. players
Waterford F.C. players
Association football midfielders
English expatriate footballers
Expatriate footballers in Iceland
National League (English football) players
English expatriate sportspeople in Iceland
Solihull Moors F.C. players
League of Ireland players